The European Athletics Championships is a biennial event (since 2010), which began in 1934. European Athletics accepts only athletes who are representing one of the organisation's European member states and the body recognises records set at editions of the European Athletics Championships. The Championships records in athletics are the best marks set in competitions at the event. The athletics events at the Championships are divided into four groups: track events (including sprints, middle- and long-distance running, hurdling and relays), field events (including javelin, discus, hammer, pole vault, long and triple jumps), road events and combined events (the heptathlon and decathlon).

Great Britain's athletes holds the greatest number of records at the Championships with a total of ten, followed by Russia (9), Germany (7), and Spain (4). Marita Koch and Heike Drechsler each hold multiple records,  Koch having broken both the 400 metres record as an individual and as part of the East German relay team and Drechsler holding the records for both long jump and 200 m. World records have been set at the Championships: the French 4×100 metres relay team ran a world record 37.79 seconds at the 1990 Championships. Several athletics events no longer take place at the Championships and thus the events are deemed defunct, and their records unchallengeable.

No records were broken at the 2012 European Athletics Championships – the first time in the history of the event. The current edition is taking place between 15 and 21 August 2022 in Munich.

Men's records

Statistics are correct as of 21 August 2022

Decathlon disciplines

Women's records

Statistics are correct as of 21 August 2022

Heptathlon disciplines

Statistics

Totals

World records

Records in defunct events

Men's events

Women's events

Notes

References

General
 European Championships Best Performances Men. European Athletics (archived). Retrieved on 2009-07-13.
 European Championships Best Performances Women. European Athletics (archived). Retrieved on 2009-07-13.
 European Championships (Men). GBR Athletics. Retrieved on 2014-01-04.
 European Championships (Women). GBR Athletics. Retrieved on 2014-01-04.

Specific

Records
European Athletics Championships
European Championships